Fayetteville County Precinct No. 2 Courthouse is a historic building located in Fayetteville, Texas.

Description and history
Built in 1880 it is of wood frame construction with horizontal wood siding and has a simple two story square plan. The south elevation is the facade with simple wood stairs and solid wood panel double doors. Windows are symmetrically placed with three bays on the north and south, and two on the east and west. Funding for painting the building was raised by holding a ball. A calaboose (holding jail) with two cells was finished in 1887. A clock tower, financed by a ladies club, was added in 1934 in the center of the hipped roof. It is no longer used as a courthouse. Precinct courthouses were quite rare in early Texas and this one was listed as an Recorded Texas Historic Landmark in 1997 and on July 10, 2008 it was designated a contributing property to the Fayetteville Historic District.

Photo gallery

See also
List of Recorded Texas Historic Landmarks (Eastland-Gray)

References

External links
 

Recorded Texas Historic Landmarks
Historic buildings and structures in the United States
National Register of Historic Places in Fayette County, Texas
Courthouses in Texas